Prasanna Namal Udugama (born October 21, 1967 නාමල් උඩුගම) is a Sri Lankan singer, composer and songwriter. One of the most popular artists in Sri Lanka, before the era of reality shows, he is regarded as a symbolic icon in modern Sri Lankan music industry. The health issues in 2014 made him to slow his singing career. Udugama recovered well from a successful liver transplant in mid-2015.

Early life and career
Udugama's father is a businessman and his mother is a housewife. He has two brothers and two sisters. He is the youngest in the family. Namal was educated at Hewahata Central college in Kandy. At school, he played guitar and performed at school events, before joining a band in Kandy. Udugama moved to Colombo, where he began to release albums. He composed and performed the song "Samuganne Na Wenwanne Na"; the song established his career in the Sri Lankan music industry. Udugama is married to actress Ruwanthi Mangala, and they have one daughter, Dehemi and one son, Nomitha.

In February 2015, Udugama became severely ill due to a liver failure condition and admitted to the intensive care unit of a leading private hospital in Colombo. His wife announced that he needs A-negative blood type for the immediate cure. He underwent four life saving operations in Sri Lanka, but needed partial or total liver transplant as the final treatment. Sri Lankan Singers Association started to raise funds for the transplant with many country wide musical shows and some fans also donated money to Namal. After few days, there was a misleading news that he was dead. He was thereafter treated in Global City Hospital in India for the liver transplant . The required liver lobe was given by a cousin of his wife and the surgery was done by Dr Gomathy Narasimhan, who is a Senior Consultant HPB & Liver Transplant Surgery at Global Health City, Chennai. He returned to Sri Lanka with a successful transplant on June 5, 2015.
Before the surgery he released Sanda Aithiya song and after recovery, he released a solo hit Thamath Oya in 2015, which gathered crowd back towards him.

Track listing

Solo tracks

References

 Sri Lankan artist Namal Udugama 
 Latest informations of Singer Namal Udugama 
 Gossips of Sri Lankan artists 
 Sri Lankan singers of all time 
 Most popular songs by Namal Udugama

External links
 http://lktunes.com/sri-lankan-artist/140/namal-udugama
 http://www.videomart95.info/2010/01/namal-udugama.html
 http://www.geerasa.com/2012/07/namal-udugama-with-sunflower-01-free.html
 http://www.filestube.com/query.html?q=namal+udugama+old+songs&select=All
 https://pipl.com/directory/name/Udugama/Namal/
 Namal Udugama Guitar Chords
 සිනා අතරින් නාමල් රසිකයන්ට කඳුළු සිතාසි බාරදෙයි

1970 births
Living people
Sri Lankan composers
21st-century Sri Lankan male singers
Sinhalese singers
20th-century Sri Lankan male singers